Carmelo García (born 3 December 1939) is a Spanish boxer. He competed in the men's light welterweight event at the 1960 Summer Olympics.

References

1939 births
Living people
Spanish male boxers
Olympic boxers of Spain
Boxers at the 1960 Summer Olympics
Sportspeople from Las Palmas
Light-welterweight boxers